Tetraethylammonium hydroxide is the organic compound with the formula (C2H5)4NOH, abbreviated Et4NOH.  It is the tetraethylammonium salt of hydroxide.  It is used and dispensed as solutions in water or alcohols, which are colorless and highly alkaline.  The compound is a common reagent in organic synthesis.  It is also employed in the preparation of zeolites.

Structure

Tetraethylammonium hydroxide is most commonly encountered as an aqueous solution.  Several hydrates NEt4OH·xH2O. have been crystallized, including x = 4, 5, 9.  These salts feature well separated Et4N+ cations and hydroxide anions.  The hydroxide groups are linked by hydrogen bonds to the water of crystallization. Anhydrous Tetraethylammonium hydroxide has not been isolated.

Synthesis and reactions
It is prepared from tetraethylammonium bromide by salt metathesis, using a hydroxide-loaded ion exchange column or by the action of silver oxide. Attempted isolation of Et4NOH induces Hofmann elimination, leading to triethylamine and ethylene.

Treatment of Et4NOH with a wide range of acids gives water and the other tetraethylammonium salts:
Et4NOH + HX -> Et4NX + H2O

References

Tetraethylammonium salts
Hydroxides